Pakorn Prempak ( born 2 February 1993), simply known as Bas, is a Thai professional footballer who plays as a winger for Thai League 1 club Port and the Thailand national team.

International career

Pakorn Prempak played for Thailand U19, and played in the 2012 AFC U-19 Championship qualification. He debuted for the first team against win China 5-1 in 2013. Pakorn scored a goal against Faroe Islands for Thailand U23. Pakorn was part of Thailand Selected Team which competed in the 2013 Merdeka Tournament. Pakorn scored the winning goal against Singapore U23 in the tournament. He represented Thailand U23 in the 2013 Southeast Asian Games. He represented Thailand U23 in the 2014 Asian Games. Pakorn won the 2015 Southeast Asian Games with Thailand U23. In 2018 he was called up by Thailand national team for the 2018 AFF Suzuki Cup.

International goals

Under-19

Under-23

Honours

Club
Port
 Thai FA Cup: 2019

International
Thailand U-19
 AFF U-19 Youth Championship: 2011

Thailand U-23
 Sea Games Gold Medal: 2013, 2015

Individual
 Thai League 1 Top Assists: 2021–22

References

External links
 Profile at Goal
 

1993 births
Living people
Pakorn Prempak
Pakorn Prempak
Association football wingers
Pakorn Prempak
Pakorn Prempak
Pakorn Prempak
Pakorn Prempak
Pakorn Prempak
Footballers at the 2014 Asian Games
Pakorn Prempak
Southeast Asian Games medalists in football
Competitors at the 2013 Southeast Asian Games
Competitors at the 2015 Southeast Asian Games
Pakorn Prempak